Forester was an American Thoroughbred racehorse best known for winning the 1882 Belmont Stakes.

Background

Forester was bred at Nursery Stud in New York by August Belmont Jr. His sire was The Ill-Used, who had been imported into the states, and his dam was Woodbine. Forester was later sold to Lucien O. Appleby & Davy C. Johnson, the owners of La Belle Stud.

Racing career

As a three-year-old, Forester won the Withers Stakes, making him the heavy favorite to win the Belmont Stakes in June of that year. The 1882 Belmont Stakes had a field of only three horses and Forester, ridden by Jim McLaughlin, won the race by five lengths, leading the entire time. He was the last New York-bred horse to win the Belmont until Tiz the Law won in 2020.

Forester took a two-year break from racing after the three-year-old season, and returned in 1885. He raced four more times that year, bringing his total amount of starts to 15. He won five of those races, and his total career earnings were $13,125.

Pedigree

References

1879 racehorse births
Racehorses bred in New York (state)
Racehorses trained in the United States
Belmont Stakes winners